Via Laietana Vía Layetana in Spanish, is a major thoroughfare in Barcelona, Catalonia, Spain, in the Ciutat Vella district. The avenue runs from Plaça Urquinaona to Plaça d'Antonio López, by the seafront, and separates the neighbourhoods of the old city it has on either side: La Ribera/El Born and Sant Pere on one and Barri Gòtic on the other. Besides being always overcrowded with both locals and tourists attracted by its Modernista Art Nouveau, Art Déco, and Noucentista neo-classical architecture, in addition to its nearness to the Ramblas and the quiet pedestrian streets of Barri Gòtic, Via Laietana hosts the headquarters of a number of banks (notably the building of the old Caixa Catalunya) and institutions.

It can be seen as an extension of Carrer de Pau Claris in Eixample. Via Laietana was named after the Laietanii, an Iberian people who inhabited the region around Barcelona, Maresme, Vallès, and Baix Llobregat.

History
The construction of Via Laietana was first projected in 1879 and started in 1907, with the aim of communicating Eixample with the waterfront, amid much controversy. The demolition of a large number of houses and the removal of the streets in the area was required to do so. As some of the traditional guilds of the city, some dating back to the Middle Ages, were located there, they had to be relocated in different parts of Barri Gòtic, notably Plaça de Sant Felip Neri. The first section to be built was named Carrer de Bilbao, which nowadays is a separate, shorter street that stems from the larger Via Laietana. The avenue was finished in 1926. Francesc Cambó, a prominent politician of the time, built his personal residence in the avenue. During the years of the Spanish Civil War (1936-1939) it was renamed Via Durruti.

Architecture
As an avenue built in the early 20th century, its buildings reflect the aesthetic ideals of the period, and of the different political regimes. The style of some of its buildings has no other referent in Barcelona and has much more in common with the architecture that can be seen in Madrid. A number of these buildings are being converted into hotels.

Buildings of interest
Conservatori Superior de Música del Liceu
Caixa de Pensions Building (1917), by Enric Sagnier - Unusual office building built in a trend of the Neo-Gothic style inspired by central European churches with a white façade. 
Casa Bulbena-Salas (1924-1926) by Joan A. Roig.
Edifici del Col·legi d'Enginyers Industrials (1922) by Antoni Ferrater.
Casa Artur Suqué (1927) by Adolf Florensa.
Caixa Catalunya building (1931) by José Yárnoz Larrosa and Luis Menéndez Pidal Álvarez - It's been the Caixa Catalunya headquarters since 1955, but originally hosted Banco de España.
Casa dels Velers (1758-1763) by Juan Garrido i Bertrán
Foment del Treball building (1934-1936) by Adolf Florensa - rationalist building, influenced by the Chicago School.
Edifici de Tabacs (1923) by Francesc Guàrdia Vidal.
Edifici de Correus (1926-1927 by Josep Goday Casals and Jaume Torres Grau.

Places of interest in the vicinity
Palau de la Música Catalana
Santa Caterina market
Cathedral of Santa Eulàlia

Two closed metro stations

Via Laietana hosted two metro stations that were finally dismantled and abandoned because of different reasons. Correos was closed because of major changes in the metro line that crossed the area, and Banco was never opened.

Transport

Bus
Line 17
Line 19
Line 40
Line 45

Metro
Jaume I (L4)
Urquinaona (L1, L4)

Gallery

See also
History of Barcelona
Carrer de Pau Claris
Adolf Florensa
Francesc Cambó, Avinguda de Francesc Cambó
List of streets and squares in Eixample

 Street names in Barcelona
 Urban planning of Barcelona

References
ALBAREDA, Joaquim, GUÀRDIA, Manel i altres. Enciclopèdia de Barcelona, Gran Enciclopèdia Catalana, Barcelona, 2006.

External links
Photo gallery at Poblesdecatalunya.cat

Streets in Barcelona
Ciutat Vella